Thomas J. Morrison  (August 15, 1869 – March 27, 1902) was a professional baseball player. He played infield in the National League for the Louisville Colonels. He appeared in a total of 14 games over the 1895 and 1896 seasons.

External links

1869 births
1902 deaths
Major League Baseball infielders
Louisville Colonels players
Baseball players from Missouri
19th-century baseball players
Montgomery Grays players
Austin Senators players
New Orleans Pelicans (baseball) players